Hugh Joseph Maguire is an American film and television actor. He is known for playing Ed Mathews in the American sitcom television series Live-In. He also played the role of Hugh in fifteen episodes of Cheers.

Maguire has guest-starred in television programs including 227, Knots Landing. Growing Pains, Wings and L.A. Law. He has also appeared in films such as Batman v Superman: Dawn of Justice, Vanishing on 7th Street, The Double. In 2021 he appeared in the film No Sudden Move.

Filmography

Film

Television

References

External links 

Rotten Tomatoes profile

Living people
Place of birth missing (living people)
Year of birth missing (living people)
American male television actors
American male film actors
20th-century American male actors
21st-century American male actors